Stephen Grover O'Rourke (April 26, 1887 – September 22, 1944) was an American football and basketball coach and Major League Baseball (MLB) scout. He served as the head football coach at Little Rock College in Little Rock, Arkansas from 1908 to 1910, the College of St. Thomas—now known as the University of St. Thomas—in Saint Paul, Minnesota from 1914 to 1915, St. Mary's College—now known as Saint Mary's Academy and College—in St. Marys, Kansas from 1915 to 1920 and again from 1934 to 1928, and Saint Louis University from 1931 to 1922.

O'Rourke became a scout for the Detroit Tigers in the 1920s and the New York Yankees in 1939. He died from a lingering heart ailment on September 22, 1944, at Saint Joseph Hospital in Denver.

Head coaching record

Football

References

19th-century births
1944 deaths
Detroit Tigers scouts
Holy Cross Crusaders football players
Little Rock Eagles football coaches
New York Yankees scouts
Saint Louis Billikens football coaches
Saint Louis Billikens men's basketball coaches
Saint Mary's Knights football coaches
St. Thomas (Minnesota) Tommies football coaches
Sportspeople from Rochester, New York
Players of American football from New York (state)